Lanzini is an Italian surname. Notable people with the surname include:

 Ennio Zelioli-Lanzini (1899–1976), Italian politician
 Manuel Lanzini (born 1993), Argentine football attacking midfielder
 Tomás Lanzini (born 1991), Argentine footballer

Italian-language surnames